The Return of Dogtanian (Spanish: El retorno de D'Artacán) is a 1989 Spanish-British children's  animated television series, and a sequel to the 1981 series Dogtanian and the Three Muskehounds, that continues the classic 1844 Alexandre Dumas story of d'Artagnan and The Three Musketeers, produced by Spanish studio BRB Internacional, Televisión Española and Thames Television with animation of Wang Film Productions and Morning Sun Animation.

In 1995, BRB Internacional released a television film edited from the series entitled Dogtanian: One For All and All For One.

Production
In 1989 The Return of Dogtanian was produced by BRB Internacional, Televisión Española and Thames Television with animation of Wang Film Productions and Morning Sun Animation. Like the first series, 26 episodes were produced. Its budget was 650 million pesetas.

The story is loosely based on the novel The Vicomte of Bragelonne: Ten Years Later also by Alexandre Dumas, itself building on the myth of The Man in the Iron Mask. It picks up ten years after the first series story ends, with Dogtanian and Juliette now married and living together on the outskirts of Paris with their two children, Philippe and Fleur. The Muskehounds are reunited by Queen Anne when her husband starts acting suspiciously. Cardinal Richelieu is still featured, along with Milady and Widimer still loyal to him.

Dave Mallow and Doug Stone, who co-adapted the original scripts to English and co-directed, took over as the voices of Dogtanian, and Porthos, respectively. As it was produced in Taiwan by Wang Film Productions and Morning Sun Animation, Nippon Animation, the Japanese studio which produced the first series, was not involved in the sequel.

Cast

 Aramis – Eddie Frierson
 Juliette – Rebecca Forstadt
 Pip – Steve Kramer
 Widimer – Mike Reynolds
 Cardinal Richelieu – Kerrigan Mahan
 Queen Anne – Robin Levenson
 King Louis – Simon Prescott
 Narrator – Michael McConnohie
 Dogtanian – Dave Mallow
 Porthos – Doug Stone
 Athos – Michael Sorich
 Beajeaux – Steve Bulen
 Elexy – Robert Axelrod
 Philippe – Brianne Siddall

Episode list
 "At France's Service"
 "In Paris Again"
 "Bad News"
 "The Gold Muzzle"
 "The Rescue Mission"
 "A Secret Forever"
 "The Magician's Cave"
 "The King Been Poisoned"
 "A Special Visit"
 "Change of Plans"
 "The Impostor"
 "One More in the Group"
 "Trapped by Blanbec"
 "A Surprise for Richelieu"
 "Pedrigreen Hood"
 "Widimer Complicates Things"
 "The Best Archer"
 "Rescuing Dogtanian"
 "The King's Cousin"
 "A Robbery in the Dance"
 "The Black Rose"
 "A Terrific Surprise"
 "Fleur Kidnapping"
 "Where is Fleur?"
 "The Rescue of Fleur"
 "Tréville's Successor"

Television film
In 1995, BRB Internacional released a television film edited from the series entitled Dogtanian: One For All and All For One, with completely different voice actors and a few name changes from the original series.

Home media

DVD releases
This series was only released as a box-set and not as individual volumes. There are 4 disks in the set. Unlike the first series which is in Region 0 format, the second series was released in Region 2 format. The DVD of the TV movie was also released in Region 0.
 The television films Dogtanian: Special and Dogtanian: One For All And All For One. 26 July 2004.
 Dogtanian – The Complete Second Series Boxset. 4 July 2005.

In November 2010, a version that contains both series and both television films was released exclusively for HMV. Later, the complete box set was made available at other retailers.

VOD
Nowadays the series is still being broadcast on different platforms such as YouTube and Netflix.

References

External links
 Official page at BRB International
 Muskehounds.com
 
 Dogtanian.net

Spanish children's animated action television series
Spanish children's animated comedy television series
Spanish children's animated fantasy television series
Australian Broadcasting Corporation original programming
Animated television series about dogs
Television shows based on The Three Musketeers
Fictional anthropomorphic characters
Period television series
RTVE shows
Television shows set in France
Television series set in the 17th century
Cultural depictions of Cardinal Richelieu
Cultural depictions of Louis XIII